Overrun may refer to:

 Overrun brake
 Overrun, the condition of a vehicle travelling without throttle, see freewheel
 Overrunning clutch, see freewheel
 Buffer overrun, see buffer overflow
 Overrun is the section of a runway, sometimes called a blast pad, that is used as an emergency space to slowly stop planes after an aborted takeoff or a problem on landing
 Cost overrun
 Overrun is the amount of air injected into soft serve ice creams
 Overrun (film), a 2021 American action crime comedy